Judith is an oil-on-canvas painting executed in 1620–1622 by Simon Vouet. It represents the Biblical Judith holding the severed head of Holofernes. The painting is held at the Kunsthistorisches Museum in Vienna.

References

Paintings depicting Judith
1622 paintings
Paintings in the collection of the Kunsthistorisches Museum
Paintings by Simon Vouet